Gamasellus pyriformis is a species of mite in the family Ologamasidae.

References

pyriformis
Articles created by Qbugbot
Animals described in 1916